The Hungary national wheelchair handball team is the national wheelchair handball team of Hungary and is controlled by the Hungarian Handball Federation.

Competitive record

European Wheelchair Handball Nations’ Tournament

References

External links

IHF profile
EHF Team Page

National wheelchair handball teams
Handball in Hungary
Wheelchair Handball